Sir John Andrew  (19 August 1896 – 5 August 1968) was a New Zealand farmer, company director, and trade negotiator. He was born at Mosgiel, New Zealand, on 19 August 1896.

In 1953, Andrew was awarded the Queen Elizabeth II Coronation Medal. In the 1957 New Year Honours, he was appointed a Commander of the Order of the British Empire, for services to farming. He was promoted to Knight Commander of the same order, for public services, in the 1963 Queen's Birthday Honours.

References

1896 births
1968 deaths
People from Mosgiel
New Zealand farmers
New Zealand Knights Commander of the Order of the British Empire